This is a list of countries by annual natural gas consumption. For informational purposes, several non-sovereign entities are also included in this list.

References

Energy-related lists by country
 Consumption
Lists of countries
Energy consumption